Eupromerella is a genus of beetles in the family Cerambycidae, containing the following species:

 Eupromerella boliviana Santos-Silva, Botero & Wappes 2020
 Eupromerella clavator (Fabricius, 1801)
 Eupromerella fuscicollis (Bates, 1861)
 Eupromerella gallardi Tavakilian & Neouze 2013
 Eupromerella griseofasciata (Fuchs, 1959)
 Eupromerella inaequalis (Galileo & Martins, 2011)
 Eupromerella leucogaea (Erichson, 1847)
 Eupromerella maculata Martins, Galileo & de-Oliveira, 2009
 Eupromerella minima (Bates, 1861)
 Eupromerella nigroapicalis (Aurivillius, 1916)
 Eupromerella nigroocellata (Tippmann, 1960)
 Eupromerella orbifera (Aurivillius, 1908)
 Eupromerella picturata Martins, Galileo & de-Oliveira, 2009
 Eupromerella plaumanni (Fuchs, 1959)
 Eupromerella propinqua (Melzer, 1931)
 Eupromerella pseudopropinqua (Fuchs, 1959)
 Eupromerella quadrituberculata (Zajciw, 1964)
 Eupromerella semigrisea (Bates, 1861)
 Eupromerella travassosi (Melzer, 1935)
 Eupromerella versicolor (Melzer, 1935)

References

Acanthoderini